Lucus Planum is a region on Mars, named after an albedo feature. Its name was approved by the IAU in 1997. The center latitude of the feature is 4.99 degrees S and the center longitude is 182.83 degrees It lies just to the east and north east of the volcano Apollinaris Patera. Lucus Planum lies in both the  Memnonia quadrangle and the Aeolis quadrangles. It is part of a region called the "Medusae Fossae Formation" Part of this region is covered with yardangs. They are formed by the action of wind on sand sized particles; hence they often point in the direction that the winds were blowing when they were formed. Views of yardangs in this region are shown below.

See also 
 Aeolis quadrangle
 HiRISE
 HiWish
 Memnonia quadrangle
 Planetary nomenclature
 Yardang
 Yardangs on Mars

References

Plains on Mars
Memnonia quadrangle
Aeolis quadrangle